Aquilegia vulgaris is a species of columbine native to Europe with common names that include: European columbine, common columbine, granny's nightcap, and granny's bonnet.  It is a flowering herbaceous perennial plant growing to 1.2 m tall, with branched, thinly hairy stems. The leaves are biternate; each leaf has three groups of three leaflets. The flowers, in various shades of purple, blue, pink and white, are pendent or horizontal with strongly hooked spurs, and appear in early summer.

The Latin specific epithet vulgaris means "common".

Native Range
The species is native to Albania, Austria, Baltic States, Belarus, Belgium, Bulgaria, Central European Rus, Corse, Czechoslovakia, France, Germany, Great Britain, Greece, Hungary, Ireland, Italy, Netherlands, Northwest European Region, Poland, Portugal, Romania, Sicilia, Spain, Switzerland, Yugoslavia. It has been introduced to many other areas including parts of North and South America, and other parts of Europe and north eastern Asia.

Cultivation
This species and various hybrids derived from it are popular garden flowers, available in a variety of single colours and bi-colours, in single and double forms. Though perennial, cultivars may be short-lived and thus best treated as biennials. Spent flower-heads should be removed to prevent the plant going to seed. Cultivars include the Barlow series (‘Nora Barlow’, 'Black Barlow', 'Rose Barlow', 'Christa Barlow'), 'Pretty Bonnets'. Seeds may be sold as mixtures. The white flowering cultivar 'Nivea' has gained the Royal Horticultural Society's Award of Garden Merit.

Pests and diseases
Aphids and sawfly larvae may attack the plant.

Folklore
In traditional herbalism columbine was considered sacred to Venus; carrying a posy of it was said to arouse the affections of a loved one. Nicholas Culpeper recommended the seeds taken in wine to speed the process of childbirth. In modern herbal medicine it is used as an astringent and diuretic.

Toxicity
The plant is a member of the poisonous Ranunculus family and all parts of the plant, including the seeds, are poisonous if ingested. It is possible that inhaling the crushed seeds dust or otherwise absorbing oils from them may cause poisoning or at minimum exhibit symptoms of poisoning.

The acute toxicity test in mice showed that ethanol extract and the main flavonoid compound isocytisoside from the leaves and stems of Aquilegia vulgaris can be classified as nontoxic since a dose of 3000 mg/kg did not cause mortality in mice.

Gallery

References

vulgaris
Flora of Europe
Medicinal plants of Europe
Plants described in 1753
Taxa named by Carl Linnaeus